Xystophora carchariella is a moth of the family Gelechiidae. It is found from southern and central Europe to the Ural Mountains, Sweden and the Baltic States. Outside of Europe, it is also found in Turkey, China and the Russian Far East.

The wingspan is 11–12 mm. Adults have been recorded on wing in June and July.

The larvae have been found on Kashubian vetch (Vicia cassubica) and Vicia pisiformis. They spin two leaves together and feed from within. They can be found from July to September. Pupation takes place within this shelter. The species overwinters in the larval stage.

References

Moths described in 1839
Xystophora
Moths of Europe
Moths of Asia